The Rome Statute of the International Criminal Court is the treaty that established the International Criminal Court (ICC). It was adopted at a diplomatic conference in Rome, Italy on 17 July 1998 and it entered into force on 1 July 2002. As of November 2019, 123 states are party to the statute. Among other things, it establishes court function, jurisdiction and structure.

The Rome Statute established four core international crimes: genocide, crimes against humanity, war crimes, and the crime of aggression. Those crimes "shall not be subject to any statute of limitations". Under the Rome Statute, the ICC can only investigate and prosecute the four core international crimes in situations where states are "unable" or "unwilling" to do so themselves; the jurisdiction of the court is complementary to jurisdictions of domestic courts. The court has jurisdiction over crimes only if they are committed in the territory of a state party or if they are committed by a national of a state party; an exception to this rule is that the ICC may also have jurisdiction over crimes if its jurisdiction is authorized by the United Nations Security Council.

Purpose

The Rome Statute established four core international crimes: (I) Genocide, (II) Crimes against humanity, (III) War crimes, and (IV) Crime of aggression. Following years of negotiation, aimed at establishing a permanent international tribunal to prosecute individuals accused of genocide and other serious international crimes, such as crimes against humanity, war crimes and crimes of aggression, the United Nations General Assembly convened a five-week diplomatic conference in Rome in June 1998 "to finalize and adopt a convention on the establishment of an international criminal court".

History

Background
The Rome Statute is the result of multiple attempts for the creation of a supranational and international tribunal. At the end of the 19th century, the international community took the first steps toward the institution of permanent courts with supranational jurisdiction. With the Hague International Peace Conferences of 1899 and 1907, representatives of the most powerful nations made an attempt to harmonize laws of war and to limit the use of technologically advanced weapons. 

After World War I and even more after the heinous crimes committed during World War II, it became a priority to prosecute individuals responsible for egregious crimes so serious that they needed to be exemplified by being referred to as "crimes against humanity". 

In order to re-affirm basic principles of democratic civilisation, the alleged criminals were not executed in public squares or sent to torture camps, but instead treated as criminals: with a regular trial, the right to defense and the presumption of innocence. The Nuremberg trials marked a crucial moment in legal history, and after that, some treaties that led to the drafting of the Rome Statute were signed.

UN General Assembly Resolution n. 260 9 December 1948, the Convention on the Prevention and Punishment of the Crime of Genocide, was the first step toward the establishment of an international permanent criminal tribunal with jurisdiction on crimes yet to be defined in international treaties. In the resolution there was a hope for an effort from the Legal U.N. commission in that direction. 

The U.N. General Assembly, after the considerations expressed from the commission, established a committee to draft a statute and study the related legal issues. In 1951 a first draft was presented; a second draft followed in 1955 but there were a number of delays, officially due to the difficulties in the definition of the crime of aggression, that were only solved with diplomatic assemblies in the years following the statute's coming into force. The geopolitical tensions of the Cold War also contributed to the delays.

In December 1989, Trinidad and Tobago asked the General Assembly to re-open the talks for the establishment of an international criminal court and in 1994 presented a draft Statute. The General Assembly created an ad hoc committee for the International Criminal Court and, after hearing the conclusions, a Preparatory Committee that worked for two years (1996–1998) on the draft. 

Meanwhile, the United Nations created the ad hoc tribunals for the former Yugoslavia (ICTY) and for Rwanda (ICTR) using statutes—and amendments due to issues raised during pre-trial or trial stages of the proceedings—that are quite similar to the Rome Statute.

Establishment
During its 52nd session, the UN General Assembly decided to convene a diplomatic conference "to finalize and adopt a convention on the establishment of an international criminal court".  The conference was convened in Rome from 15 June–17 July 1998.  It was attended by representatives from 161 member states, along with observers from various other organizations, intergovernmental organizations and agencies, and non-governmental organizations (including many human rights groups) and was held at the headquarters of the Food and Agriculture Organization of the United Nations, located about 4 km away from the Vatican (one of the states represented).  On 17 July 1998, the Rome Statute was adopted by a vote of 120 to 7, with 21 countries abstaining.

By agreement, there was no official record of each delegation's vote regarding the adoption of the Rome Statute. Therefore, there is some dispute over the identity of the seven countries that voted against the treaty. 

It is certain that the People's Republic of China, Israel, and the United States were three of the seven because they have publicly confirmed their negative votes; India, Indonesia, Iraq, Libya, Qatar, Russia, Saudi Arabia, Sudan, and Yemen have been identified by various observers and commentators as possible sources for the other four negative votes, with Iraq, Libya, Qatar, and Yemen being the four most commonly identified. 

Explanations of Vote was publicly declared by India, Uruguay, Mauritius, Philippines, Norway, Belgium, United States, Brazil, Israel, Sri Lanka, China, Turkey, Singapore, and the United Kingdom.

On 11 April 2002, ten countries ratified the statute at the same time at a special ceremony held at the United Nations headquarters in New York City, bringing the total number of signatories to sixty, which was the minimum number required to bring the statute into force, as defined in Article 126.  The treaty entered into force on 1 July 2002; the ICC can only prosecute crimes committed on or after that date.

The states parties held a Review Conference in Kampala, Uganda from 31 May to 11 June 2010. The Review Conference adopted a definition of the crime of aggression, thereby allowing the ICC to exercise jurisdiction over the crime for the first time. It also adopted an expansion of the list of war crimes.  Amendments to the statute were proposed to implement these changes.

Ratification status

Jurisdiction, structure and amendment

The Rome Statute outlines the ICC's structure and areas of jurisdiction. The ICC can prosecute individuals (but not states or organizations) for four kinds of crimes: genocide, crimes against humanity, war crimes, and the crime of aggression. These crimes are detailed in Articles 6, 7, 8, and 8 bis of the Rome Statute, respectively. They must have been committed after 1 July 2002, when the Rome Statute came into effect.

The ICC has jurisdiction over these crimes in three cases: first, if they took place on the territory of a State Party; second, if they were committed by a national of a State Party; or third, if the crimes were referred to the Prosecutor by the UN Security Council. The ICC may begin an investigation before issuing a warrant if the crimes were referred by the UN Security Council or if a State Party requests an investigation. Otherwise, the Prosecutor must seek authorization from a Pre-Trial Chamber of three judges to begin an investigation proprio motu (on its own initiative). The only type of immunity the ICC recognizes is that it cannot prosecute those under 18 when the crime was committed. In particular, no officials – not even a head of state – are immune from prosecution.

The Rome Statute established three bodies: the ICC itself, the Assembly of States Parties (ASP), and the Trust Fund for Victims. The ASP has two subsidiary bodies. These are the Permanent Secretariat, established in 2003, and an elected Bureau which includes a president and vice-president.  The ICC itself has four organs: the Presidency (with mostly administrative responsibilities); the Divisions (the Pre-Trial, Trial, and Appeals judges); the Office of the Prosecutor; and the Registry (whose role is to support the other three organs). The functions of these organs are detailed in Part 4 of the Rome Statute.

Any amendment to the Rome Statute requires the support of a two-thirds majority of the states parties, and an amendment (except those amending the list of crimes) will not enter into force until it has been ratified by seven-eighths of the states parties. A state party which has not ratified such an amendment may withdraw with immediate effect. Any amendment to the list of crimes within the jurisdiction of the court will only apply to those states parties that have ratified it. It does not need a seven-eighths majority of ratifications.

See also

International Criminal Court Act 2001
Völkerstrafgesetzbuch
World Day for International Justice

Notes and references

Further reading

 Roy S Lee (ed.), The International Criminal Court: The Making of the Rome Statute.  The Hague: Kluwer Law International (1999). .
 Roy S Lee & Hakan Friman (eds.), The International Criminal Court: Elements of Crimes and Rules of Procedure and Evidence.  Ardsley, NY: Transnational Publishers (2001).  .
William A. Schabas, Flavia Lattanzi (eds.), Essays on the Rome Statute of the International Criminal Court Volume I. Fagnano Alto: il Sirente (1999). 
Claus Kress, Flavia Lattanzi (eds.), The Rome Statute and Domestic Legal Orders Volume I. Fagnano Alto: il Sirente (2000). 
 Antonio Cassese, Paola Gaeta & John R.W.D. Jones (eds.), The Rome Statute of the International Criminal Court: A Commentary.  Oxford: Oxford University Press (2002). .
William A. Schabas, Flavia Lattanzi (eds.), Essays on the Rome Statute of the International Criminal Court Volume II. Fagnano Alto: il Sirente (2004). 
 William A Schabas, An Introduction to the International Criminal Court (2nd ed.).  Cambridge:  Cambridge University Press (2004). .
Claus Kress, Flavia Lattanzi (eds.), The Rome Statute and Domestic Legal Orders Volume II. Fagnano Alto: il Sirente (2005).

External links

 Original text of the Rome Statute
 Text of the Rome Statute as amended in 2010 and 2015 – Human Rights & International Criminal Law Online Forum
 Draft Statute of an International Criminal Court, 1994
 
 International Criminal Court website
 
 Parliamentary network mobilized in support of the universality of the Rome Statute

 
International Criminal Court
Human rights instruments
Genocide
Crimes against humanity
War crimes
Crime of aggression
1998 in Italy
1990s in Rome
Italy and the United Nations
Treaties concluded in 1998
Treaties entered into force in 2002
Treaties of the Afghan Transitional Administration
Treaties of Albania
Treaties of Andorra
Treaties of Antigua and Barbuda
Treaties of Argentina
Treaties of Australia
Treaties of Austria
Treaties of Bangladesh
Treaties of Barbados
Treaties of Belgium
Treaties of Belize
Treaties of Benin
Treaties of Bolivia
Treaties of Bosnia and Herzegovina
Treaties of Botswana
Treaties of Brazil
Treaties of Bulgaria
Treaties of Burkina Faso
Treaties of Burundi
Treaties of Cape Verde
Treaties of Cambodia
Treaties of Canada
Treaties of the Central African Republic
Treaties of Chad
Treaties of Chile
Treaties of Colombia
Treaties of the Comoros
Treaties of the Democratic Republic of the Congo
Treaties of the Republic of the Congo
Treaties of the Cook Islands
Treaties of Costa Rica
Treaties of Croatia
Treaties of Cyprus
Treaties of the Czech Republic
Treaties of Denmark
Treaties of Djibouti
Treaties of Dominica
Treaties of the Dominican Republic
Treaties of East Timor
Treaties of Ecuador
Treaties of El Salvador
Treaties of Estonia
Treaties of Fiji
Treaties of Finland
Treaties of France
Treaties of Gabon
Treaties of the Gambia
Treaties of Georgia (country)
Treaties of Germany
Treaties of Ghana
Treaties of Grenada
Treaties of Greece
Treaties of Guatemala
Treaties of Guinea
Treaties of Honduras
Treaties of Hungary
Treaties of Iceland
Treaties of Ireland
Treaties of Italy
Treaties of Ivory Coast
Treaties of Japan
Treaties of Jordan
Treaties of Kenya
Treaties of South Korea
Treaties of Kuwait
Treaties of Kyrgyzstan
Treaties of Latvia
Treaties of Lesotho
Treaties of Liberia
Treaties of Liechtenstein
Treaties of Lithuania
Treaties of Luxembourg
Treaties of North Macedonia
Treaties of Madagascar
Treaties of Malawi
Treaties of the Maldives
Treaties of Mali
Treaties of Malta
Treaties of the Marshall Islands
Treaties of Mauritius
Treaties of Mexico
Treaties of Moldova
Treaties of Mongolia
Treaties of Montenegro
Treaties of Namibia
Treaties of Nauru
Treaties of the Netherlands
Treaties of New Zealand
Treaties of Niger
Treaties of Nigeria
Treaties of Norway
Treaties of the State of Palestine
Treaties of Panama
Treaties of Paraguay
Treaties of Peru
Treaties of the Philippines
Treaties of Poland
Treaties of Portugal
Treaties of Romania
Treaties of Saint Kitts and Nevis
Treaties of Saint Lucia
Treaties of Saint Vincent and the Grenadines
Treaties of Samoa
Treaties of San Marino
Treaties of Senegal
Treaties of Serbia
Treaties of Serbia and Montenegro
Treaties of Seychelles
Treaties of Sierra Leone
Treaties of Slovakia
Treaties of Slovenia
Treaties of South Africa
Treaties of Spain
Treaties of Suriname
Treaties of Sweden
Treaties of Switzerland
Treaties of Tajikistan
Treaties of Tanzania
Treaties of Trinidad and Tobago
Treaties of Tunisia
Treaties of Uganda
Treaties of the United Kingdom
Treaties of Uruguay
Treaties of Vanuatu
Treaties of Venezuela
Treaties of Yemen
Treaties of Zambia
Treaties establishing intergovernmental organizations
Treaties extended to Greenland
Treaties extended to the Faroe Islands
Treaties extended to the Netherlands Antilles
Treaties extended to Aruba
Treaties extended to Anguilla
Treaties extended to Bermuda
Treaties extended to the British Virgin Islands
Treaties extended to the Cayman Islands
Treaties extended to the Falkland Islands
Treaties extended to Montserrat
Treaties extended to the Pitcairn Islands
Treaties extended to Saint Helena, Ascension and Tristan da Cunha
Treaties extended to the Turks and Caicos Islands
Treaties extended to Akrotiri and Dhekelia
Treaties extended to the Isle of Man
Treaties extended to Gibraltar
June 1998 events in Europe